The snailfishes or sea snails are a family of marine ray-finned fishes, these fishes make up the Liparidae which is classified within the order Scorpaeniformes.

Widely distributed from the Arctic to Antarctic Oceans, including the oceans in between, the snailfish family contains more than 30 genera and about 410 described species, but there are also many undescribed species. Snailfish species can be found in depths ranging from shallow surface waters to greater than 8,000 meters, and species of the Liparid family have been found in seven ocean trenches.

Taxonomy
The snailfish family, Liparidae, was first proposed by the American biologist Theodore Gill in 1861. The 5th edition of Fishes of the World classifies this family within superfamily Cyclopteroidea, part of the suborder Cottoidei of the order Scorpaeniformes. Other authorities do not recognise this superfamily and classify the two families within it, Cyclopteridae and  Liparidae, within the infraorder Cottales alongside the sculpins, within the order Perciformes. An osteological analysis found that the genus Bathylutichthys was intermediate between the Psychrolutidae and the two families making up the Cyclopteroidea, meaning that those two families would not be supported as a superfamily within the Cottoidei.

Description
The snailfish family is poorly studied and few specifics are known. Their elongated, tadpole-like bodies are similar in profile to the rattails. Their heads are large (compared to their size) with small eyes; their bodies are slender to deep, tapering to very small tails. The extensive dorsal and anal fins may merge or nearly merge with the tail fin. Snailfish are scaleless with a thin, loose gelatinous skin; some species, such as Acantholiparis opercularis have prickly spines, as well. Their teeth are small and simple with blunt cusps. The deep-sea species have prominent, well-developed sensory pores on the head, part of the animals' lateral line system.

The pectoral fins are large and provide the snailfish with its primary means of locomotion although they are fragile. In some species such as the antarctic Paraliparis devriesi, the pectoral fins have an expanded somatosensory system, including a taste bud. The snailfish are benthic fish with pelvic fins modified to form an adhesive disc; this nearly circular disc is absent in Paraliparis and Nectoliparis species. Research has revealed that maximum depth of living can be a significant predictor for loss of the pelvic disk is certain species of snailfish. Based on phylogenetic analysis, this ancestral feature has been lost three separate times in Snailfish. Snailfish range in size from Paraliparis australis at 5 cm (2.0 in) to Polypera simushirae at some 77 cm (30 in) in length. The latter species may reach a weight of 11 kg (24 lb), but most species are smaller. Snailfish are of no interest to commercial fisheries.

It was difficult to initially study snailfish species that dwell at deeper levels because they would explode upon being brought to the surface, but researchers did manage to study the bones of the animal.

It was difficult to initially study snailfish species that dwell at deeper levels because they would explode upon being brought to the surface, but researchers did manage to study the bones of the animal.

Occurrence and habitat

Snailfish habitats vary widely. This is a wider depth range than any other family of fish. It has been found that they travel from the abyssal to the hadal zone over their lifetime. They are strictly found in cold waters, meaning that species of tropical and subtropical regions strictly are deepwater. They are common in most cold marine waters and are highly resilient, with some species, such as Liparis atlanticus and Liparus gibbus, having type-1 antifreeze proteins. It is the most species-rich family of fish in the Antarctic region, generally found in relatively deep waters (shallower Antarctic waters are dominated by Antarctic icefish).

The diminutive inquiline snailfish (Liparis inquilinus) of the northwestern Atlantic is known to live out its life inside the mantle cavity of the scallop Placopecten magellanicus. Liparis tunicatus lives amongst the kelp forests of the Bering Strait and the Gulf of St. Lawrence. The single species in genus Rhodichthys is endemic to the Norwegian Sea. Other species are found on muddy or silty bottoms of continental slopes.

These were, at the time, the deepest living fish ever recorded on film. The species in these deepest records remain undescribed, but it has been referred to as the "ethereal snailfish". In general, snailfish (notably genera Notoliparis and Pseudoliparis) are the most common and dominant fish family in the hadal zone. Through genomic analysis it was found that Pseudoliparis swirei possesses multiple molecular adaptions to survive the intense pressures of a deep sea environment, including pressure-tolerant cartilage, pressure-stable proteins, increased transport protein activity, higher cell membrane fluidity, and loss of eyesight and other visual characteristics such as color.

Reproduction and life span

Reproductive strategies vary extensively among snailfish species. As far as known, all species lay eggs that are relatively large in size (diameter up to ). The number of eggs varies extensively depending on species. Some deposit their egg mass among cold-water corals, kelp, stones, or xenophyophores. It is possible that the male guards the egg mass. At least one species, Careproctus ovigerus of the North Pacific, is known to practice mouth brooding; that is, the male snailfish carries the developing eggs around in his mouth. Some other species of the genus Careproctus are parasitic, laying their eggs in the gill cavities of king crabs. One species, Careproctus rhodomelas, was found instead to be a batch spawner, laying multiple batches of large eggs multiple times throughout its lifetime. After the eggs hatch, some species rapidly reach the adult size and only live for about one year, but others have life spans of more than a decade.

Diet
In a 2007 study of fish in the hadal zone, it was revealed that snailfish usually feed on amphipods, which were also attracted to the chum that the researchers left out.
Larval snailfish feed on a mix of plankton, small and large copepods, and amphipods. The diet of larval snailfish contains 28 food categories, mainly copepods and amphipods. 

Snailfish prey can be grouped into six main categories: gammarid, krill, natantian decapods, other crustaceans, fish, and others. Size also affects snailfish diets. Species smaller than 50 mm primarily eat gammarids, while species larger than 100 mm primarily eat natantian decapods. Species larger than 150 mm have the highest proportion of fish in their diet. Larger snailfish species tend to be piscivorous.

Genera
This family contains these genera as of 2020:

 Acantholiparis Gilbert & Burke, 1912
 Aetheliparis Stein, 2012
 Allocareproctus Pitruk & Fedorov, 1993
 Careproctus Krøyer, 1862
 Crystallichthys Jordan & Gilbert, 1898
 Eknomoliparis Stein, Meléndez C. & [[Ismael U. Kong|Kong U].], 1991
 Elassodiscus Gilbert & Burke, 1912
 Eutelichthys Tortonese, 1959
 Genioliparis Andriashev & Neyelov, 1976
 Gyrinichthys Gilbert, 1896
 Liparis Scopoli, 1777
 Lipariscus Gilbert, 1915
 Lopholiparis Orr, 2004
 Menziesichthys Nalbant & Mayer, 1971
 Nectoliparis Gilbert & Burke, 1912
 Notoliparis Andriashev, 1975
 Osteodiscus Stein, 1978
 Palmoliparis Balushkin, 1996
 Paraliparis Collett, 1879
 Polypera Burke, 1912
 Praematoliparis Andriashev, 2003
 Prognatholiparis Orr & Busby, 2001
 Psednos Barnard, 1927
 Pseudoliparis Andriashev, 1955
 Pseudonotoliparis Pitruk, 1991
 Rhinoliparis Gilbert, 1896
 Rhodichthys Collett, 1879
 Squaloliparis Pitruk & Fedorov, 1993
 Temnocora Burke, 1930
 Volodichthys Balushkin, 2012

References

External links

Cyclopteroidea
Taxa named by Theodore Gill